The Billboard Hot Latin Songs (formerly Hot Latin Tracks and Hot Latin 50) is a record chart in the United States for Latin songs, published weekly by Billboard magazine. Since October 2012, chart rankings are based on digital sales, radio airplay, and online streaming, and only predominantly Spanish language songs are allowed to rank. The chart was established by the magazine on September 6, 1986, and was originally based on airplay on Latin music radio stations. Songs on the chart were not necessarily in Spanish language, since a few songs in English and Portuguese language have also charted.

The first number one song of the Hot Latin Songs chart was "La Guirnalda" by Rocío Dúrcal on September 6, 1986. As of the issue for the week ending on March 18, 2023, the chart has had 455 different number one hits, while 184 artists have reached number one (as a lead or a featured act). The current number one song is "TQG" by Karol G and Shakira.

History
On September 6, 1986, Billboard premiered a Latin music singles chart: the Hot Latin 50. During the 1980s decade, the data were compiled by the Billboard chart and research department with information from 70 Spanish-language radio stations in the United States and Puerto Rico. Those radio stations were selected based on their number of listeners, and were asked to report their playlists for the week. Since 1994, this data was compiled by Nielsen Broadcast Data Systems (BDS), which electronically monitors radio stations in more than 120 music markets across the United States. Before this chart's inception, the Latin music information on the magazine was presented only in the form of the biweekly album sales chart Top Latin Albums, which continues to be listed separately. There were no language restrictions on the chart, since a few songs in English and Portuguese have charted and even reached number one on five occasions. Three genre-specific Latin subcharts were introduced with and were factored in the Hot Latin Songs chart: Latin Pop Airplay,  Regional Mexican Airplay, and Latin Tropical Airplay. A fourth subchart, the Latin Rhythm Airplay chart was established in 2005 in response to the growing influence of Latin hip hop and reggaeton music.

According to the Billboard electronic database, the first number one song on the Hot Latin 50 was "La Guirnalda" by Spanish singer Rocío Dúrcal on September 6, 1986. However, in the listings included in the first printed publication of the chart on October 4, 1986, the first number-one song was "Yo No Sé Qué Me Pasó" by Mexican singer-songwriter Juan Gabriel. In 2016, Billboard stated that the chart was introduced on the issue dated October 4, 1986, but the magazine's official website recognizes the previous issues from September 6, 1986, to September September 27, 1986, as well as Rocío Durcal's number one on the debut issue.

Due to the increasing popularity of downloads sales and streaming data, Billboard updated the methodology for the Hot Latin Songs chart on October 11, 2012, to include digital sales and streaming activity in addition to airplay, as well as making only predominantly Spanish-language songs eligible for inclusion and increasing airplay data to more than 1,200 radio stations across the United States. The chart's previous methodology was formatted to the Latin Airplay chart with the Latin genre-charts now being component charts of the Latin Airplay chart.

Component charts
There are several component charts that contribute to the overall calculation of Hot Latin Songs. These are:
Latin Digital Songs: The chart measures the best-selling Spanish-language digital songs. It was established on January 23, 2010. "Loba" by Shakira was the first number-one song on the chart. "Danza Kuduro" by Don Omar featuring Lucenzo is the longest-running number-one, with 94 non-consecutive weeks from May 14, 2011, to July 20, 2013.
Latin Streaming Songs: The chart measures the most-streamed Spanish-language songs and videos on selected online music services. It was established on April 20, 2013. "Hips Don't Lie" by Shakira featuring Wyclef Jean was the first number-one song on the chart. "Bailando" by Enrique Iglesias featuring Descemer Bueno and Gente de Zona is the longest-leading number-one, with 66 non-consecutive weeks from May 17, 2015, to April 16, 2016.

Compilation
The tracking week for sales and streaming begins on Friday and ends on Thursday, while the radio play tracking-week runs from Monday to Sunday. A new chart is compiled and officially released to the public by Billboard on Tuesday. Each chart is post-dated with the "week-ending" issue date four days after the charts are refreshed online (i.e., the following Saturday). For example:

Friday, January 1 – sales tracking-week begins, streaming tracking-week begins
Monday, January 4 – airplay tracking-week begins
Thursday, January 7 – sales tracking-week ends, streaming tracking-week ends
Sunday, January 10 – airplay tracking-week ends
Tuesday, January 12 – new chart released, with issue post-dated Saturday, January 16

Hot Latin Songs policy changes
The methods and policies by which this data is obtained and compiled have changed many times throughout the chart's history.

Digital downloads, linguistic requirement, and online streaming
Since October 11, 2012, the Billboard Hot Latin Songs tracks paid digital downloads and streaming activity. Billboard initially started tracking downloads since January 10, 2010, with the Latin Digital Songs chart. However, these downloads did not count towards Hot Latin Songs. In addition, Billboard imposed a linguistic requirement;  a song must be predominantly sung in Spanish to be eligible to rank on the chart. A component Latin Streaming Songs chart was introduced on April 20, 2013, which ranks web radio streams from services such as Spotify, as well as on-demand audio titles.

Recurrents
Billboard, in an effort to allow the chart to remain as current as possible and to give proper representation to new and developing artists and tracks, has removed titles that have reached certain criteria regarding its current rank and number of weeks on the chart. A song is permanently moved to "recurrent status" if it has spent 20 weeks on Hot Latin Songs and fallen below position number 25. Additionally, descending songs are removed from the chart if ranking below number 10 after 26 weeks or below number five after 52 weeks.

Records

Songs

Top 10 songs of All-Time (1986–2021)
In 2016, for the 30th anniversary of Hot Latin Songs, Billboard magazine compiled a ranking of the 50 best-performing songs on the chart over the 30 years, along with the best-performing artists. Billboard has stated that "due to changes in chart methodology over the years, eras are weighted differently to account for chart turnover rates over various periods." The top 20 was updated in 2018, while the most current update of the list was published in September 2021.

Most weeks at number one
56 weeks – Luis Fonsi and Daddy Yankee featuring Justin Bieber – "Despacito" (2017)
41 weeks – Enrique Iglesias featuring Descemer Bueno and Gente de Zona – "Bailando" (2014)
30 weeks – Nicky Jam and Enrique Iglesias – "El Perdón" (2015)
27 weeks – Bad Bunny and Jhay Cortez – "Dákiti" (2021)
25 weeks – Shakira featuring Alejandro Sanz – "La Tortura" (2005)

Most total weeks
125 weeks – Romeo Santos – "Propuesta Indecente" (2013)
110 weeks – Luis Fonsi and Daddy Yankee featuring Justin Bieber – "Despacito" (2017)
78 weeks – Bad Bunny and Jhay Cortez – "Dakiti" (2020)
62 weeks – Prince Royce – "Incondicional" (2012)
61 weeks – Son by Four – "A Puro Dolor" (2000)

Artists

Most number-one singles
27 – Enrique Iglesias
16 – Luis Miguel
15 – Gloria Estefan
13 - Shakira
12 – Bad Bunny
11 – Ricky Martin
10 – Marco Antonio Solís, Maná, Wisin & Yandel

Most top 10 singles
59 – Bad Bunny
39 – Luis Miguel
38 – Enrique Iglesias
34 – Shakira
30 - Daddy Yankee
29 – Chayanne, Cristian Castro

Most chart entries
143 – Bad Bunny
94 – Ozuna
81 – Daddy Yankee
77 – Anuel AA
73 – J Balvin
66 – Los Tigres del Norte
61 – Vicente Fernández

Year-End

Most years at number one
3 – Ana Gabriel, Enrique Iglesias, Juan Gabriel, Bad Bunny
2 – Daddy Yankee, Justin Bieber, Luis Fonsi, Nicky Jam, Selena

Most years in the top 10
12 – Enrique Iglesias
8 – Daddy Yankee
7 – Ana Gabriel, Luis Miguel, Marco Antonio Solís, Shakira
6 – J Balvin, Juan Gabriel, La Arrolladora Banda El Limón, Los Bukis, Marc Anthony, Ricky Martin, Romeo Santos
5 – Ricardo Montaner

See also
Billboard Top Latin Songs Year-End Chart
List of Billboard Hot Latin Songs chart achievements and milestones
Billboard Hot 100

Notes

References

External links
Official Billboard site
Current Billboard Hot Latin Songs 
Current Billboard Top Latin Songs on Telemundo

Billboard charts
Latin music